Anthony Maisonnial (born 23 March 1998) is a French professional footballer who plays as a goalkeeper for Andrézieux. He has played for France national youth teams starting from the France under-16 national team.

Club career

Saint-Étienne
Born and raised in Saint-Étienne, and an all-time fan of his forming club, Maisonnial is a product of Saint-Étienne's youth academy. He made his debut for the Ligue 1 side on 17 December 2016 against Lorient replacing Robert Berič in the 13th minute after keeper Jessy Moulin was sent off in a 2–1 away loss. At the end of the 2017–18 season, Maisonnial did not renew his first professional contract.

Sion
In May 2018, it was announced Maisonnial would join Sion for the 2018–19 season having agreed to a four-year contract.
In his first game for Sion, he conceded a goal from over 82 meters. That meant the end of his career at Sion.

Paris FC
In July 2019 Maisonnial was able to terminate his contract with Sion and sign a two-year deal with Paris FC in Ligue 2. After eleven league starts before Christmas in 2019, Maisonnial made way for a back-to-form Vincent Demarconnay and was relegated to the bench. He agreed the termination of his contract on 4 January 2021.

Bourg-en-Bresse
On 5 January 2021, Maisonnial signed with Championnat National side Bourg-en-Bresse, a club with close ties to his agent.

Andrézieux
On 5 July 2022, Maisonnial joined Andrézieux in Championnat National 2.

References

External links
 
 
 

1998 births
Living people
People from Saint-Priest-en-Jarez
Sportspeople from Loire (department)
Association football goalkeepers
French footballers
France youth international footballers
AS Saint-Étienne players
FC Sion players
Paris FC players
Football Bourg-en-Bresse Péronnas 01 players
Andrézieux-Bouthéon FC players
Ligue 1 players
Swiss Super League players
Ligue 2 players
Championnat National players
Championnat National 2 players
Championnat National 3 players
French expatriate footballers
Expatriate footballers in Switzerland
French expatriate sportspeople in Switzerland
Footballers from Auvergne-Rhône-Alpes